Beyblade Burst Turbo, known in Japan as Beyblade Burst Super Z (Cho Z) (ベイブレードバースト超ゼツ, Beiburēdo Bāsuto Chōzetsu) or Beyblade Chozetsu, is a 2018 anime series and the third season of Beyblade Burst. The series was produced by D-rights and TV Tokyo and animated by OLM, and it premiered on TXN stations in Japan on April 2, 2018. This was the last Beyblade Burst series with TV Tokyo's involvement, as well as the last one to premiere on TV in Japan. An English dub of the anime premiered on Teletoon in Canada on October 7, 2018 and on Disney XD in the United States on December 15, 2018. The opening theme is "Chouzetsu Muteki Blader! (Transcendence Invincible Blader!)" by Ryosuke Sasaki while the ending is "BEY-POP" by Shun Kusakawa. For the international version the theme music is "Turbo"; an instrumental version is used for the credits.



Episode list

References

Burst Season 3
2018 Japanese television seasons
2019 Japanese television seasons
Zainichi Korean culture